Kells was a constituency represented in the Irish House of Commons until 1800.

History
In the Patriot Parliament of 1689 summoned by James II, Kells was not represented.

Members of Parliament, 1561–1801
1560 Thomas Shiele and Nicholas Ledwiche
1585 Thomas Fleming, Nicholas Dax and Patrick Plunkett
1613–1615 Oliver Plunket and Gerald Balfe
1634–1635 Walter Evers of Ballyardan and Adam Cusack of Trevett
1639–1649 Robert Cusack (expelled and replaced 1642 by William Ball) and Oliver Plunket (died and replaced 1641 by Patrick Barnewell. Barnewell died and replaced 1645 by Patrick Tallant)
1661–1666 John Forth, Arthur Purefoy, Richard Stephenson and Robert Shapcote (Shapcote did not sit).

1689–1801

Notes

References

Bibliography

Constituencies of the Parliament of Ireland (pre-1801)
Historic constituencies in County Meath
1561 establishments in Ireland
1800 disestablishments in Ireland
Constituencies established in 1561
Constituencies disestablished in 1800